Narrowcasting is the dissemination of information (usually via Internet, radio, newspaper, or television) to a narrow audience, rather than to the broader public at-large. Related to niche marketing or target marketing, narrowcasting involves aiming media messages at specific segments of the public defined by values, preferences, demographic attributes, and/or subscription. Narrowcasting is based on the postmodern idea that mass audiences do not exist.

The term narrowcasting can also apply to the spread of information to an audience (private or public) which is by nature geographically limited—a group such as office employees, military troops, or conference attendees—and requires a localized dissemination of information from a shared source.

History of the term 
The term narrowcasting was coined by Charles Herrold in the early 20th century to designate radio transmissions meant for a single receiver, distinguished from  broadcasting, meant for a general audience. The term was revived in the context of subscription radio programs in the late 1940s, the term first entered the common lexicon due to computer scientist and public broadcasting advocate J. C. R. Licklider, who in a 1967 report envisioned

a multiplicity of television networks aimed at serving the needs of smaller, specialized audiences. 'Here,' stated Licklider, 'I should like to coin the term "narrowcasting," using it to emphasize the rejection or dissolution of the constraints imposed by commitment to a monolithic mass-appeal, broadcast approach.'

Origins and evolution on television 
In the beginning of the 1990s, when American television was still mainly ruled by three major networks (ABC, CBS and NBC), it was believed that the greatest achievement was to promote and create content that would be directed towards a huge mass of people, avoiding completely those projects that might appeal to only a reduced audience. That was mainly due to the fact that specially in the earlier days of television, there was not much more competition. Nevertheless, this changed once independent stations, more cable channels, and the success of videocassettes started increasing and rising, which gave the audiences the possibility of having more options. Thus, this previous mass-oriented point of view started to change towards one that was, obviously, narrower.

It was precisely the arrival of cable TV that allowed a much larger number of producers and programmers to aim at smaller audiences. For example, whereas MTV started off as the channel for those who loved music, it ended up with so many different shows that nowadays it rarely ever "trades in the 'music' of her name anymore", proving how the big networks evolved through a constant stage of diaspora with the aim to provide content appealing to a variety of audiences.

Nowadays, despite the fact that the major networks keep promoting mostly content whose main aim is to get to a huge audience, narrowcasting has of course made its place in, for example, the way they schedule shows. For example, while one night they might choose to stream shows directed at teenagers, a different night they might want to focus on another specific kind of audience, such as those interested in documentaries. Therefore, they will be targeting what could be seen as a narrow audience, but collect their attention altogether as a mass audience on one night.

Social impact 
This evolution towards narrowcasting was discussed in 1993 by Hamid Naficy, who focused on this change specifically in Los Angeles and how such a content directed towards a much more narrowed audience affected social culture. For example, with the rise of Middle Eastern television programs, these ended up constituting "part of the dynamic and multifaceted popular cultures produced and consumed by immigrant and exile communities in southern California." Therefore, more content that did not have the pressure to have a mass audience appeal to watch it, was able to be produced and promoted, which made it easier for minorities to feel represented in television.

Commercial application 

Marketing experts are often interested in narrowcast media as a commercial advertising tool, since access to such content implies exposure to a specific and clearly defined prospective consumer audience. The theory being that, by identifying particular demographics viewing such programs, advertisers can better target their markets. Pre-recorded television programs are often broadcast to captive audiences in taxi cabs, buses, elevators and queues (such as at branches of the Post Office in the United Kingdom). For instance, the Cabvision network in London's black cabs shows limited pre-recorded television programs interspersed with targeted advertising to taxicab passengers. Television has made a transition from broadcasting to narrowcasting which has given advertisers a greater advantage when it comes to directing their messages to a specific demographic audience. For example, if an energy drink company wanted to target 18- to 25-year-old action sport athletes, they may purchase commercial time on a niche network that only narrowcasts mixed martial arts, thus making their message more valuable by marketing to a concentrated audience.

On the Internet 

The Internet uses both a broadcast and a narrowcast model. Most websites are on a broadcast model since anyone with Internet access can view the sites (Wikipedia is a good example, this website can be received by anyone with an internet connection). However, sites that require one to log-in before viewing content are based more on the narrowcast model. Push technologies which send information to subscribers are another form for narrowcasting. Perhaps the best example of narrowcasting are electronic mailing lists where messages are sent only to individuals who subscribe to the list.

Narrowcasting is also sometimes applied to podcasting, since the audience for a podcast is often specific and sharply defined. Dr. Jonathan Sterne of McGill University stated, "Narrowcasting is a form of broadcasting, if the latter term is understood as the 'wide dissemination of content through mechanical or electronic media'". Other one-way, traditional media approaches to narrowcasting, such as Internet Talk Radio, can be contrasted with broadcast radio programs. Narrowcasting approaches are focused on a specific (narrow) topic, whereas broadcast programs have a wider coverage of broad topics.

Interactive narrowcasting 

A new type of narrowcasting is evolving in the form of interactive narrowcasting. Interactive narrowcasting enables shoppers to influence the content displayed via narrowcasting. One way of doing this is via a touch screen. More and more systems are being introduced into the narrowcasting market.

User-driven content also provides an excellent medium for narrowcast marketing, provided the correct product is matched with the appropriate medium.

These systems enable brands to communicate with their customers via a personal computer. The advantage of the majority of interactive narrowcasting projects is that they are more effective and less costly over time.

See also 
 Webcasting
 Podcasting
 Video blog
 Data aggregator
 Microtargeting
 National Narrowcasting Network
 Personalcasting

References 

Lotz, Amanda D. (2007) “The Television Will Be Revolutionized”.New York. NY:New York University Press. p. 180

http://www.signageinfo.com/tag/narrowcasting/

External links 
 Narrowcasting: Using Digital Media for Selective Marketing and Advertising

Broadcasting
Market segmentation
Political campaign techniques
1967 neologisms